Kentucky Route 354 (KY 354) is a  state highway in the U.S. state of Kentucky. The highway travels through portions of London, in Laurel County.

Route description
KY 354 begins at an intersection with KY 80 (East 4th Street) in the northeastern part of London, within Laurel County. It travels to the north-northwest, paralleling railroad tracks of CSX. It curves to the north-northeast, leaving the railroad tracks. It curves to the northwest and the north-northwest and meets its northern terminus, an intersection with the Hal Rogers Parkway. Here, the roadway continues as KY 30.

Major intersections

See also

References

0354
Transportation in Laurel County, Kentucky
London, Kentucky micropolitan area